Barcza  is a village in the administrative district of Gmina Masłów, within Kielce County, Świętokrzyskie Voivodeship in south-central Poland.

Location

Population
The village has a population of 331.

References

Barcza